Irfan Saadat Khan (born 7 February 1963) is a Pakistani jurist who has been Senior Justice of the Sindh High Court since 15 March 2017.

References

1963 births
Living people
Judges of the Sindh High Court
Pakistani judges